Yann Daniélou (born 10 April 1966) is a retired French football defender.

References

1966 births
Living people
French footballers
Stade Brestois 29 players
En Avant Guingamp players
Tours FC players
Stade Lavallois players
Nîmes Olympique players
Canet Roussillon FC players
Association football defenders
Ligue 1 players
Ligue 2 players